Hortense is a feminine given name. It may also refer to:

 Hurricane Hortense (disambiguation)
 Hortense-class frigate
 French frigate Hortense (1803), lead ship of the class
 Hortense, Georgia, an unincorporated community in the United States